The rivière des Mornes (in English: Mornes river) crosses the municipality of Saint-Luc-de-Bellechasse (MRC Les Etchemins Regional County Municipality), as well as Notre-Dame-Auxiliatrice-de-Buckland and Saint-Philémon, in the Bellechasse Regional County Municipality, in the administrative region of Chaudière-Appalaches, in Québec, in Canada.

The Rivière des Mornes is a tributary of the west bank of the rivière de la Fourche, which flows northward to empty onto the south bank of the rivière du Sud (Montmagny); the latter flows northwest, then northeast to the south shore of the St. Lawrence River.

Geography 

The main neighboring watersheds of the Des Mornes river are:
 North side: rivière de la Fourche, rivière des Originaux, rivière du Sud (Montmagny);
 East side: rivière de la Fourche, brook du Milieu, brook Beaudoin;
 South side: Milieu stream, Belles Amours stream, rivière à Bœuf, Blanche River;
 West side: rivière des Fleurs, Etchemin River.

The Mornes river has its source in the township of Standon, in the municipality of Saint-Luc-de-Bellechasse, in the Les Etchemins Regional County Municipality. These mountains are part of the Notre Dame Mountains chain.

  towards the north-west in Saint-Luc-de-Bellechasse, up to the limit of Notre-Dame-Auxiliatrice-de-Buckland;
  towards the northeast, in the township of Buckland, in the municipality of Notre-Dame-Auxiliatrice-de-Buckland, to the limit Saint-Philémon;
  towards the northeast in Saint-Philémon, until its confluence.

The confluence of the Mornes river is located at a place called "Les Trois-Fourches" and constitutes the head of the rivière de la Fourche.

Toponymy 
The name “Rivière des Mornes” is associated with the mountainous terrain of the area.

The toponym “rivière des Mornes” was made official on February 18, 1977, at the Commission de toponymie du Québec.

See also 

 List of rivers of Quebec

References 

Rivers of Chaudière-Appalaches
Bellechasse Regional County Municipality
Les Etchemins Regional County Municipality